Disaffected is the eighth album by Piano Magic.

Track listing
"You Can Hear the Room" – 6:22
"Love & Music" – 4:50
"Night of the Hunter" – 3:16
"Disaffected" – 7:18
"Theory of Ghosts" – 4:01
"Your Ghost" – 5:35
"I Must Leave London" – 3:07
"Deleted Scenes" – 3:59
"The Nostalgist" – 3:58
"You Can Never Get Lost (When You've Nowhere to Go)" – 4:18

Credits
Bass – Alasdair Steer
Drums, Percussion, Keyboards, Piano, Programmed By – Jerome Tcherneyan
Guitar, Keyboards – Franck Alba
Keyboards, Programmed By – Cedric Pin
Vocals – Angèle David-Guillou; John Grant (musician) ("Your Ghost")
Voice, Guitar, Programmed By – Glen Johnson

References

2005 albums
Piano Magic albums